Plusiocalpe is a genus of moths of the family Nolidae. The genus was erected by William Jacob Holland in 1894.

Species
 Plusiocalpe atlanta Viette, 1968
 Plusiocalpe micans (Saalmüller, 1891)
 Plusiocalpe pallida Holland, 1894
 Plusiocalpe sericina (Mabille, 1900)

References

Chloephorinae